The 2004 New Zealand rugby union tour of Europe was a series of matches played in November–December 2004 in Italy, France and Great Britain by New Zealand national rugby union team

Results

Italy: 15. Kaine Robertson, 14. Ludovico Nitoglia, 13. Walter Pozzebon, 12. Matteo Barbini, 11. Matteo Pratichetti, 10. Rima Wakarua, 9. Paul Griffen, 8. David dal Maso, 7. Mauro Bergamasco, 6. Aaron Persico, 5. Santiago Dellapè, 4. Marco Bortolami (capt.), 3. Salvatore Perugini, 2. Fabio Ongaro, 1. Andrea Lo Cicero, – Replacements: 16. Giorgio Intoppa, 17. Salvatore Costanzo, 18. Enrico Pavanello, 19. Silvio Orlando, 20. Pietro Travagli, 21. Luciano Orquera, 22. Gert Peens 
New Zealand: 15. Mils Muliaina, 14. Rico Gear, 13. Conrad Smith, 12. Tana Umaga (capt), 11. Joe Rokocoko, 10. Dan Carter, 9. Byron Kelleher, 8. Mose Tuiali'i, 7. Richie McCaw, 6. Jerry Collins, 5. Norm Maxwell, 4. Chris Jack, 3. Carl Hayman, 2. Anton Oliver, 1. Saimone Taumoepeau, – Replacements: 16. Corey Flynn, 17. Greg Somerville, 18. Ali Williams, 19. Steven Bates, 20. Jimmy Cowan, 21. Aaron Mauger, 22. Ma'a Nonu 

Wales: 15. Gareth Thomas(capt.), 14. Tom Shanklin, 13. Sonny Parker, 12. Gavin Henson, 11. Shane Williams, 10. Stephen Jones, 9. Dwayne Peel, 8. Michael Owen, 7. Colin Charvis, 6. Dafydd Jones, 5. Gareth Llewellyn, 4. Brent Cockbain, 3. Adam Jones, 2. Mefin Davies, 1. Gethin Jenkins, – Replacements: 16. Steve Jones, 17. Duncan Jones, 18. Ryan Jones, 19. Martyn Williams, 20. Gareth Cooper – Unused: 21. Ceri Sweeney, 22. Rhys Williams
New Zealand: 15. Mils Muliaina, 14. Doug Howlett, 13. Casey Laulala, 12. Aaron Mauger, 11. Joe Rokocoko, 10. Dan Carter, 9. Piri Weepu, 8. Mose Tuiali'i, 7. Richie McCaw (capt.), 6. Rodney So'oialo, 5. Ali Williams, 4. Chris Jack, 3. Greg Somerville, 2. Keven Mealamu, 1. Tony Woodcock, – Replacements: 17. Carl Hayman, 20. Byron Kelleher, 21. Ma'a Nonu  – Unused: 16. Anton Oliver, 18. Reuben Thorne, 19. Marty Holah, 22. Rico Gear

France: 15. Clément Poitrenaud, 14. Aurélien Rougerie, 13. Tony Marsh, 12. Brian Liebenberg, 11. Cédric Heymans, 10. Julien Peyrelongue, 9. Frédéric Michalak, 8. Imanol Harinordoquy, 7. Olivier Magne, 6. Serge Betsen, 5. Jérôme Thion, 4. Fabien Pelous (capt.), 3. Pieter de Villiers, 2. William Servat, 1. Sylvain Marconnet, – Replacements: 16. Sébastien Bruno, 17. Olivier Milloud, 18. Pascal Papé, 19. Julien Bonnaire, 20. Mathieu Barrau, 21. Yannick Jauzion, 22. Christophe Dominici 
New Zealand: 15. Mils Muliaina, 14. Doug Howlett, 13. Conrad Smith, 12. Tana Umaga (capt.), 11. Joe Rokocoko, 10. Dan Carter, 9. Byron Kelleher, 8. Rodney So'oialo, 7. Richie McCaw, 6. Jerry Collins, 5. Norm Maxwell, 4. Chris Jack, 3. Carl Hayman, 2. Anton Oliver, 1. Tony Woodcock, – Replacements: 16. Keven Mealamu, 17. Greg Somerville, 18. Ali Williams, 21. Aaron Mauger, 22. Ma'a Nonu – Unused: 19. Mose Tuiali'i, 20. Piri Weepu

References

2004 rugby union tours
2004 in New Zealand rugby union
2004
2004–05 in European rugby union
2004–05 in Italian rugby union
2004–05 in Welsh rugby union
2004–05 in French rugby union
2004
2004
2004